DeA Kids is an Italian children's television channel owned by De Agostini. The channel was launched on October 1, 2008 on Sky Italia for children aged 4–14. A month later, a timeshift version of the channel, Dea Kids +1 on November 10, 2008.

Current programming
 Bread Barbershop
 Camilla Store
 Camilla Store Best Friends
 Find Me in Paris
 Kally's Mashup
 La Famiglia Gionni
 Music Distraction
 New School
 Oggy and the Cockroaches
 Pippi Longstocking
 Street of Magic
 Talent High School
 Ted's Top Ten
 Total Drama
 Total DramaRama
 Zig & Sharko

Upcoming 
 Molly of Denali

Former programming
 All Hail King Julien
 Animalia
 Atchoo!
 Big and Small
 Boy Girl Dog Cat Mouse Cheese
 Cosmic Quantum Ray
 Creamy Mami, the Magic Angel
 Cyberchase
 Dinosaur Train
 Gaby Star
 Gakuen Alice
 Garfield and Friends
 Geronimo Stilton
 Heidi, Girl of the Alps
 Jamie's Got Tentacles
 Justice League
 Justice League Unlimited
 Kaeloo
 Kamichama Karin
 La Seine no Hoshi
 LoliRock
 Magical DoReMi
 Maya the Honey Bee
 Mr. Magoo
 Moka's Fabulous Adventures!
 Popples
 Project Puppy
 Robin Hood: Mischief in Sherwood
 Ronaldinho Gaucho's Team
 Strawberry Shortcake's Berry Bitty Adventures
 The Adventures of Puss in Boots
 The Amazing Spiez!
 The Daltons
 The New Adventures of Peter Pan
 Time Warp Trio
 Teletubbies (original series)
 Tokyo Mew Mew
 Turbo FAST
 Viky TV
 Viky TV - How To
 Wagner a Modo Mio
 Waybuloo
 Where on Earth Is Carmen Sandiego?
 Winx Club
 WordGirl
 X-Men: Evolution
 Z-Squad

References

External links
 DeA Kids

Italian-language television stations
Children's television networks
Television channels in Italy
Television channels and stations established in 2008